Polane may refer to:

Polonium hydride
Polanë, the Albanian name for Poljane, a village in Kosovo